Verhoeff is a surname. Notable people with the surname include:

 Frederick Herman Verhoeff (1874–1968), American ophthalmic surgeon who developed Verhoeff's stain
 Hendrik Verhoeff (c. 1645–1680), Dutch silversmith and assassin
 Jacobus Verhoeff (1927–2018), Dutch mathematician
 John M. Verhoeff, of the Peary expedition to Greenland of 1891–92
 Karl Wilhelm Verhoeff (1867–1944), German zoologist
 Pieter Verhoeff (1938–2019), Dutch film director
 Pieter Willemsz. Verhoeff (c. 1573–1609), Dutch captain of the Admiralty of Amsterdam

See also
 Verhoeff algorithm, a check digit algorithm invented by Jacobus Verhoeff
 Verhoef, a related surname
 Verhoeven

Dutch-language surnames